Ingleside is a historic house located near Iron Station, Lincoln County, North Carolina.  It was built about 1817, and is a two-story, five bay by three bay, Federal style brick mansion.  The front facade features a pedimented portico supported by four Ionic order stuccoed brick columns.  It was built by Congressman Daniel Munroe Forney, son of Congressman Peter Forney.

It was listed on the National Register of Historic Places in 1972.

References

External links

Historic American Buildings Survey in North Carolina
Plantation houses in North Carolina
Houses on the National Register of Historic Places in North Carolina
Federal architecture in North Carolina
Houses completed in 1817
Houses in Lincoln County, North Carolina
National Register of Historic Places in Lincoln County, North Carolina